James Lionel Rhodes (born April 9, 1942) is an American politician in the state of Minnesota. A member of the Republican Party, he served in the Minnesota House of Representatives.

References

Republican Party members of the Minnesota House of Representatives
1942 births
Living people